Alma Hogan Snell (January 10, 1923 – May 5, 2008) was an American Crow tribal historian, educator,  and herbalist. She was the granddaughter of Pretty Shield.

Snell lectured throughout the United States on the healing properties and benefits of plants, as well as on the subject of health and wellbeing. She also authored two books: A Taste of Heritage  and Grandmother's Grandchild: My Crow Indian Life.

Alma Hogan Snell died in Billings, Montana, at the age of 85 on May 5, 2008. She was a resident of Yellowtail, Montana. She was survived by her husband Bill Snell and her sons Bill Snell Jr. and Ted Hogan. and her two daughters Faith Chosa and Pearl Buchanan.

References

External links 
 Alma Hogan Snell: Crow elder passes on at 85 
 Crow Indian Recipes and Herbal Medicine, by Alma Hogan Snell
 

1923 births
2008 deaths
Crow tribe
Historians of Native Americans
20th-century American educators
Herbalists
Writers from Montana
American women historians
20th-century American women educators
Native American educators
21st-century American women
20th-century Native American women
20th-century Native Americans
21st-century Native American women
21st-century Native Americans
Native American women writers